Pop tennis since 2015, previously known as paddle tennis, is a racket game adapted from tennis and played for over a century. Compared to tennis, the court is smaller and has no doubles lanes, and the net is lower. Paddle tennis is played with a solid paddle as opposed to a strung racquet, and a depressurized tennis ball is used.

The same court is used for both singles and doubles, with doubles being the dominant form of play. The smaller court size adds a strong emphasis and advantage to net play and creates a fast and reaction-based game. The game is gaining reputation and has spread out in Dubai and Egypt, where local leagues and tournaments are organized frequently.

History 
During year 1898 pop tennis was invented by Episcopal minister Frank Peter Beal in Albion, Michigan. With its development by Beal, this sport spread in lower Manhattan because wanting to create recreational activities for neighborhood children, Beal got the city's parks and recreation department to lay courts in Washington Square Park in Greenwich Village in 1915. The first tournament was held in 1922, and the United States Paddle Tennis Association (USPTA) was formed the following year. By 1941, paddle tennis was being played in almost 500 American cities.

Although Frank Peer Beal is known as the game's inventor, Murray Geller, a player in the 1940s and ‘50s, was instrumental in creating the modern game. Elected chairman of the USPTA rules committee, he wanted to make the game more appealing to adults and instituted features including an enlarged court and an underhanded serve.

Scott Freedman has won the World’s Men’s Singles Paddle Tennis Championships 19 times, the World Men’s Doubles Championships 16 times, and the World Mixed Doubles 14 times. He wrote a book titled Paddle Tennis and Tennis: Anyone Can Play.

Similar sports 
Platform tennis is a similar sport, which was invented in 1928 in Scarsdale, New York, USA by James Cogswell and Fessenden Blanchard. The primary difference from paddle tennis is that the platform tennis court is 6 feet shorter, fenced by taut chicken wire off which the ball can be played. Platform tennis uses a solid sponge rubber ball and overhead serving is permitted. Platform tennis is popular in the Northeastern and Midwestern U.S., since the raised court (the platform) can be heated for winter play.

Padel (not to be confused with  "Paddle tennis") is also similar. Padel is typically played in doubles on an enclosed court about half the size of a tennis court. It is popular in Spain and Hispanic America.

Pickleball is a similar sport invented in 1965 on Bainbridge Island WA. It uses a similar size court and paddle, but uses a plastic "whiffle" ball.

Rules

The court 
Paddle tennis courts are constructed of the same materials as tennis courts, or can also be placed on hard beach sand. The court measures 50 feet (15.24m) baseline-to-baseline and 20 feet (6.09m) across, with the service line 3 feet (0.91m) in from the baseline. This creates a service box of 10x22 feet (3.04x6.70m). The net is placed at a height of 31 inches (0.78m). On the west coast, a restraint line is drawn 12 feet (3.66m) back parallel to the net. When in use, all players must keep both feet behind the restraint line until after the player receiving the serve has struck the ball. All paddle rules are similar to tennis. Paddle tennis second serves also have to be bounced at least once in the other opponents side.

Summary 
 Players: Four, played in a doubles format.
 Serves: Serves must be underhand. A second serve is allowed only in the event of a net ball that lands in bounds, as in tennis.
 Score: Scoring method is the same as in tennis. Matches are best of five sets.
 Ball: Tennis ball with reduced pressure.
 Paddle: Solid with no strings. May be perforated.
 Court: There are two styles of courts. East and West coast styles.
 Walls: Walls or fences play the same role as in tennis, once the ball comes in contact with either the point is over.

See also 

 Padel - with walls
 Platform tennis
 Pickleball
 Beach tennis - same format, but on sand

References 

Racket sports
Forms of tennis